Jacob Lassner is an American writer and Jewish studies academic. He is the Philip M. & Ethel Klutznick Professor of Jewish civilization Emeritus at Northwestern University and former Director of the Crown Family Center for Jewish Studies. Lassner specializes in Medieval Near Eastern history with an emphasis on urban structures, political culture and the background to Jewish-Muslim relations.

Education and honors
Lassner received a PhD degree from Yale University in 1963.

Lassner has received awards from the Guggenheim Foundation, the National Endowment for the Humanities (NEH), and the American Council of Learned Societies-Social Science Research Council.

Books

Medieval Jerusalem: Forging an Islamic City in Spaces Sacred to Christians and Jews (University of Michigan Press, 2017)
Islam in the Middle Ages (2010 projected issue date); co-author
Competing Narratives, Contested Spaces: Memory and Communal Conflict in the Medieval Near East
Jews and Muslims in the Arab World: Haunted by Pasts Real and Imagined (2007); co-author
Islamic Revolution and Historical Memory: an inquiry (2005)
Cairo's Ben Ezra Synagogue: a gateway . .  (2001)
The Middle East Remembered; Forged Identities, Competing Narratives, Contested Spaces (2000)
A Mediterranean Society: an abridgement in one volume (1999); co-authorHistory of Al Tabari: The 'Abbasid Recovery : The War Against the Zanj (Suny Series in Near Eastern Studies) (1987); co-authorIslamic Revolution and Historical Memory (1986)The History of Al-Tabari (1984); co-authorThe Shaping of Abbasid Rule (1980)The Topography of Baghdad in the early Middle Ages;: Text and studies by Jacob Lassner (1970); co-authorDemonizing the Queen of Sheba: Boundaries of Gender and Culture in Postbiblical Judaism and Medieval Islam (Chicago Studies in the History of Judaism)'' (1993)

References

External links
"Brief biography," Department of History, Northwestern University.

Living people
Writers on Zionism
Northwestern University faculty
Islam and politics
Middle Eastern studies in the United States
American orientalists
Jewish orientalists
21st-century American historians
21st-century American male writers
Year of birth missing (living people)
American male non-fiction writers